Yuraq Urqu (Quechua yuraq white, urqu mountain, "white mountain", Hispanicized spelling Yurac Orjo) is a mountain in the Wansu mountain range in the Andes of Peru, about  high. It is situated in the Apurímac Region, Antabamba Province, Antabamba District. Yuraq Urqu lies northwest of Yawriwiri and Jalanta.

References 

Mountains of Peru
Mountains of Apurímac Region